Sound of a Woman is the major label debut studio album by Canadian singer Kiesza. It is her second album after her 2008 self-titled independent release and her first full-length international debut. It was released on October 13, 2014.

Background
In February 2014, Kiesza released the video for her new single "Hideaway" through the indie label Lokal Legend. Idolator considered it unique, for having a single take through the entire video, as Kiesza walked and danced through the streets of Brooklyn. John Gentile of Rolling Stone called the style "impressive". Kiesza reported to Rolling Stone that she had trouble making the video, partly because she broke a rib just before filming, and "couldn't move for an entire month afterward." It was premiered by Annie Mac on her Mac's Special Delivery segment on BBC Radio 1. "Hideaway" debuted at number one on the UK Singles Chart issued for April 26, 2014.

Shortly after "Hideaway" charted, Kiesza released a new video for her cover of Haddaway's song "What Is Love". Mike Bell of the Calgary Herald referred to her version of the song as a "jaw-droppingly gorgeous cover of Haddaway's 1993 dance smash What Is Love?" She did a slowed down version, with a video showing her and others, slowly revealed to be without clothes, to express "raw emotions".

Kiesza described Sound of a Woman as having grunge, rock, and folk influences in addition to her usual house or dance genre and that some songs on the album would be surprising to people.

Singles
"Hideaway" was released as Kiesza's debut single on April 11, 2014. Both the song and its accompanying music video have been met with general acclaim from contemporary music critics. "Hideaway" topped the UK Singles Chart upon release, selling over 136,000 copies in its first week, becoming the third-fastest selling single of 2014 in the United Kingdom.

"Giant in My Heart" was released as the album's second single on June 13, 2014, and reached number 4 on the UK Singles Chart, while "Bad Thing" featuring American rapper Joey Badass was released as the album's third single on September 22, 2014. "No Enemiesz" was released as the album's fourth single on November 23, 2014. Its music video was released a month earlier on October 24, 2014.

"Sound of a Woman" was released as the album's fifth single on May 24, 2015. The SeeB remix of "Cut Me Loose" was released as the album's sixth and final single on August 21, 2015.

Critical reception

Sound of a Woman received generally positive reviews from music critics. At Metacritic, which assigns a normalised rating out of 100 to reviews from mainstream critics, the album received an average score of 63 based on twelve reviews, which indicates "generally favorable reviews." Brennan Carley of Spin called it "one of the most elastic albums of the 1990s, both 20 years too late and also totally in time" and noted that Kiesza "shows the insight to carve a lane out for herself in pop music that apparently nobody else felt the need to journey down." Melody Lau of Exclaim! felt that the album makes "an important statement" in the dance music scene and hailed Kiesza's voice as "exceptionally strong and versatile." Jon Caramanica of The New York Times wrote that "while [Kiesza] doesn’t quite have the freedom in her voice to mimic fully the divas she’s aiming for, she sings powerfully and with an understanding of how to deliver notes with rhythmic aggression."

Bianca Gracie of Idolator described the album as "the perfect soundtrack that feeds your '90s nostalgia." Heather Phares of AllMusic wrote that "while Sound of a Woman is slightly too long and unfocused, at its best it's a potent reminder of how much fun this sound was -- and is." Julia Leconte of NOW Magazine noticed that "at first, [...] Kiesza's debut album seems overwrought [...] but eventually, subtleties and variety emerge" and felt that "Kiesza's so much better when she reels back her impressively ranging vocals to buttery." Larry Fitzmaurice of Pitchfork noted that Sound of a Woman "fails to spark, as its homogenous textures blend together to rob this music of the personality and emotion it has when done right" and felt that the songs on the album "don't give any clues as to who Kiesza is." Elliot Greiner of Mxdwn asserted that "lyrically [Sound of a Woman] is dry, musically it leeches off of the inventiveness of its predecessors, and in total it sounds like the extended soundtrack to a Samsung advert." Sandra Sperounes of the Edmonton Journal concluded that "it's too early to tell if Kiesza will end up on the same heap of former pop-culture phenoms, but her album's brief forays into R&B [...] hint at a much more promising and multi-dimensional future for the 25-year-old redhead."

Track listing

Charts

Release history

References

2014 albums
Kiesza albums
Island Records albums
Juno Award for Dance Recording of the Year recordings